Ytre Sula (also called Nordviksula) is a mountain in the municipality of Surnadal in Møre og Romsdal county, Norway.

Location 
The peak lies just north of the village of Todalsøra and the Todalsfjorden. Ytre Sula, meaning "Outer Sula", lies next to Indre Sula, meaning "Inner Sula". The route from Ytre Sula to Indre Sula is scrambling.

References

Mountains of Møre og Romsdal
Surnadal